Mersal is a 2017 Indian Tamil-language action film directed by Atlee Kumar, who co-wrote the screenplay with V. Vijayendra Prasad and S. Ramana Girivasan. Produced by N. Ramasamy and Hema Rukmani  under the banner of Thenandal Studio Limited, Mersal features Vijay in triple roles for the first time in his career. S. J. Surya, Kajal Aggarwal, Nithya Menen and Samantha Akkineni  play the other lead roles while Vadivelu, Kovai Sarala and Sathyaraj feature as supporting characters. A. R. Rahman composed the film's soundtrack, while also handling the background score along with Qutub-E-Kripa. Ruben and G. K. Vishnu were in charge of the editing and cinematography respectively. The film follows two brothers, Vetri (Vijay), a renowned magician, and Maaran (Vijay), a doctor who charges meagre amounts for his patients, who try to expose the corrupt dealings and medical crimes of another doctor, Daniel Arockiaraj (Surya), who also happens to be the same person that killed their parents, Vetrimaaran (Vijay) and Aishwarya (Menen).

Produced on a budget of ₹1.2 billion (about US$17.5 million in 2017), Mersal was released on 18 October 2017 and received positive reviews. It was also a commercial success, grossing ₹2.6 billion (about US$39.3 million in 2017) worldwide. The film won 35 awards from 57 nominations; its direction, screenplay, music and Vijay's performances received the most attention from award groups.

Mersal received eleven nominations at the 65th Filmfare Awards South, including those for Best Director (Atlee), Best Actor (Vijay) and Best Supporting Actor (Surya). It won in two categories – Best Supporting Actress (Menen) and Best Music Director (Rahman). At the 10th Vijay Awards, it received eight nominations and won three, Favourite Film, Best Director and Favourite Song. Mersal received twelve nominations at the 7th South Indian International Movie Awards ceremony and won five awards, including Best Director for Atlee, Best Actor in a Negative Role for Surya and Best Music Director for Rahman. Among other wins, the film received ten Techofes Awards, seven Edison Awards, five Ananda Vikatan Cinema Awards, two Norway Tamil Film Festival Awards, one award for Best Foreign Film at the National Film Awards UK. and Best International actor award for Vijay at International Achievement Recognition Award UK.

Awards and nominations

See also 
 List of Tamil films of 2017

Notes

References

External links 
 Accolades for Mersal (film) at the Internet Movie Database

Mersal (film)